Cheese in the Trap is a South Korean television series adapted from a webtoon starring Park Hae-jin, Kim Go-eun, Seo Kang-joon, and Lee Sung-kyung. It aired on the cable network tvN on Mondays and Tuesdays for 16 episodes from 4 January – 1 March 2016. The series is based on the webtoon of the same name, serialized on Naver Webtoon from 2010 to 2016, although it featured an original ending since the webtoon had not been completed at the time of filming.

Synopsis
The drama focuses on the life and relationships of a group of university students, particularly the difficult relationship between hard-working scholarship student Hong Seol (Kim Go-eun) and a deceptive senior, Yoo Jung (Park Hae-jin).

Jung is rich, popular, and he is heir to Taerang Group. Although he appears to be kind to everyone around him, he is quite manipulative with a penchant for destroying those who irritate him, often by using others. When Seol discovers this, her life starts becoming so miserable she decides to take time off school. When she returns through a scholarship that was intended for Jung, he is unexpectedly nice to her and he asks her on a date. Although she is unsure what kind of person he is, they begin an awkward relationship complicated by the distance between them as well as the aftermath of his various schemes. The situation is further complicated by the arrival of Baek In-ho and his sister In-ha, childhood friends of Jung who have since had a falling out.

Cast

Main
 Park Hae-jin as Yoo Jung, Seol's senior. He is handsome, intelligent and successful, but secretly harbors a dark side to his personality. He is sometimes cold or manipulative, and has trouble forming relationships with others because of his uncertainty that they are not using him for his money. However, he is attracted to Seol.
 Kim Go-eun as Hong Seol, a beautiful and hardworking college student who struggles to figure out Yoo Jung's true intentions, but sees an innocent side in him against the advice of his childhood friend Baek In-ho.
 Seo Kang-joon as Baek In-ho, a handsome and talented pianist who is adopted into Jung's wealthy family by his father. He and his sister came from a difficult background, but he finds it easy to get along with Seol, later developing feelings for her. He and Jung were friends as children, although they later develop a bitter rivalry as he believes that Jung was responsible for instigating a fight that damaged his hand, ending his dreams of becoming a concert pianist.
 Lee Sung-kyung as Baek In-ha, In-ho's beautiful, melodramatic and materialistic older sister. She was also adopted into Jung's family as a child, and is in love with Jung, although he does not reciprocate her feelings.

Supporting

Hong family
 Kim Hee-chan as Hong Joon, Seol's younger brother who returns to Korea from the United States.
 Ahn Gil-kang as Hong Jin-tak, Seol's father.
 Yoon Bok-in as Kim Young-hee, Seol's mother.

Yeon-yi university
 Park Min-ji as Jang Bo-ra, Seol's supportive best friend.
 Nam Joo-hyuk as Kwon Eun-taek, Seol and Bo-ra's loyal friend, who is in love with Jang Bo-ra.
 Ji Yoon-ho as Oh Young-gon, a delinquent who becomes obsessed with Seol after she gave him advice when he was ostracized.
 Yoon Ji-won as Son Min-soo, a shy classmate who gains confidence by copying Seol's identity.
 Moon Ji-yoon as Kim Sang-cheol, a lazy senior in Seol's class that incessantly copies the work of Jae-woo and Seol.
 Kim Hye-ji as Lee Da-young, a girl in Seol's class who dates Young-gon.
 Cha Joo-young as Nam Joo-yeon, a girl who is obsessed with Jung at the beginning of the series.
 Yoon Ye-joo as Kang Ah-young, Seol's junior and Joon's love interest.
 Oh Hee-joon as Ha Jae-woo, a hard working, ill-tempered senior in Seol's class.
 Go Hyun as Kim Kyung-hwan, a senior in Seol's class that's good friends with Jung.
 Shin Joo-hwan as Min Do-hyun, interested in Seol.
 Lee Woo-dong as Heo Yoon-sub, Seol's boss at her university admin job.
 Hwang Seok-jeong as Professor Kang 
 Kim Jin-keun as Professor Han

Others
 Son Byong-ho as Yoo Young-soo, Jung's father.
 Kim Ki-bang as Kong Joo-yong, Seol's neighbour and Yoon-sub's boyfriend.

Production
The role of Hong Seol was first offered to Kim Go-eun, who declined it before accepting it afterwards. The role was also offered to Bae Suzy, but she declined it.

Shooting began in September 2015, and wrapped up filming in January 2016.

Original soundtrack
The soundtrack of "Cheese in the Trap" was released in six parts.

Reception
Cheese in the Trap was a success in both South Korea and China. It was sold to China for $125,000 per episode, becoming the most expensive cable series. 
It won praise for its realistic depiction of the life of university students, but was criticized for diverging from the source webtoon by placing undue focus on the second male lead and including an original ending "that was rushed and left many viewers baffled".

Ratings
In this table,  represent the lowest ratings and  represent the highest ratings.

Awards and nominations

Film

The series was adapted into a film by the same name, starring Park Hae-jin opposite with actress Oh Yeon-seo, which was released in March 2018.

References

External links
  
 Cheese in the Trap at Eight Works 
 Cheese in the Trap at Kross Pictures 
  
 
 
 Official Webtoon

2016 South Korean television series debuts
Television shows based on South Korean webtoons
Korean-language television shows
South Korean romance television series
TVN (South Korean TV channel) television dramas
2010s college television series
2016 South Korean television series endings
South Korean teen dramas
South Korean LGBT-related television shows
South Korean college television series